The Clásico Vallecaucano (Spanish for "Valle del Cauca Derby") is a football local derby contested between América de Cali and Deportivo Cali, both clubs based in Cali, Colombia. It is regarded as one of Colombia's oldest and most passionate rivalries, having been first played in an amateur regional championship in 1931, and with both contenders being closely matched in the all-time series. It has also been mentioned as one of the world's greatest football derbies by international media.

History
The rivalry between the two top clubs from Cali can be traced back to their cultural and social origins. Deportivo Cali, founded in 1912 as The Cali Football Club by a group of students returning from Europe, has always been considered the representative of the wealthy classes of the city and the Valle del Cauca region. On the other hand, América de Cali (founded in 1927) attracted supporters from the poorest, working class and popular areas of the city since its beginnings. Their first meeting is reported to have been held in a regional tournament in 1931, and was won by Deportivo Cali 1–0 after América de Cali had two goals disallowed for offside. América de Cali protested against the refereeing of this match and the club was handed a one-year suspension from local tournaments as a result. The first match between both teams in the professional league was played on 26 September 1948, with Deportivo Cali winning by a score of 4–3.

The performances of both clubs have also offered further reasons for contrast between them throughout time, with Deportivo Cali cementing their status as one of Colombia's top clubs by winning five league titles between 1965 and 1974, whilst América de Cali had to wait 35 years for their first domestic title in 1979. Furthermore, América de Cali's success during the 1980s in which the team won the domestic league five times in a row between 1982 and 1986 as well as reaching the Copa Libertadores final thrice in a row between 1985 and 1987 attracted fans from all over Colombia, greatly increasing América's supporter base. América de Cali's 1986 league title was clinched with a victory over their crosstown rival, while Deportivo Cali clinched their sixth league title in 1996 (and first in 22 years) with a scoreless draw against América de Cali on the last day of the season. With the adoption of barra brava culture by Colombian football fans in the early years of the 1990s, the rivalry between both sets of fans turned violent and matches between both teams started demanding an increased level of safety.

Statistics

Head-to-head

Honours

Records
Record wins
América de Cali: 
Home: América de Cali – Deportivo Cali 5–0, Estadio Pascual Guerrero, 29 June 1961
Away: Deportivo Cali – América de Cali 0–4, Estadio Pascual Guerrero, 14 November 1993Deportivo Cali – América de Cali 0–4, Estadio Pascual Guerrero, 22 March 2008
Deportivo Cali: 
Home: Deportivo Cali – América de Cali 5–1, Estadio Pascual Guerrero, 18 April 1951Deportivo Cali – América de Cali 6–3, Estadio Deportivo Cali, 10 October 2010
Away: América de Cali – Deportivo Cali 1–4, Estadio Pascual Guerrero, 2 October 1949América de Cali – Deportivo Cali 1–4, Estadio Pascual Guerrero, 3 March 1968

References

Colombian football rivalries
América de Cali
Deportivo Cali